Aishah Ndanusa Ahmad  (born 26 October 1976) is a Nigerian accountant and finance professional. She is currently a deputy governor of the Central Bank of Nigeria having been appointed on 6 October 2017, replacing Sarah Alade, who retired in March 2017. She was confirmed by the Nigerian Senate on 22 March 2018.

Background and education
Aishah was born in Lagos, to a Nupe Muslim family from Bida, on 26 October 1976. She attended St. Catherine's Primary School, Surulere Lagos, and Zarumai Primary School, Minna Niger State, before proceeding to Federal Government Girls’ College, Bida, for her secondary education. Aishah graduated with a BSc degree in Accounting from the University of Abuja, and went on to obtain an MBA in Finance from the University of Lagos and an MSc in Finance and Management from the Cranfield School of Management. She is an INSEAD Certified Board Director and a recipient of the Economic Development Certificate from the Harvard Kennedy School. She is also a Chartered Alternative Investment Analyst (CAIA) and a Chartered Financial Analyst (CFA) charterholder.

Career
Prior to her appointment at the Central Bank of Nigeria in 2018, she was an accomplished banker, investment manager, financial expert and corporate executive. Most recently, she served as Executive Director, Retail Banking at Diamond Bank Plc.

She started out in the private sector as an auditor at Z.O. Ososanya & Company, and then as Chief Financial Officer at Manstructs Group Ltd.

Her  banking career started in 2001 at First Interstate Bank (Nigeria) Plc., where she was recruited as Executive Assistant, Treasury Group, after which she proceeded to NAL Bank Plc as Head of Private Banking where she worked till 2005. Later, she was Head of Retail Banking (Energy Group) and Group Head (Asset Management Business Development) at Zenith Bank Group. From 2009 until 2014, she served in various capacities at Stanbic IBTC Bank Plc including as Head, Private Clients/High Net Worth Individuals, before leaving for Diamond Bank to lead its retail business. She retired as Executive Director, Retail Banking at Diamond Bank Plc following her appointment to the CBN. Other assignments in the past have included stints at the Bank of New York Mellon and at Synesix Financial Limited.

She is Chairperson of the Board for SOS Children's Villages, an independent, non-governmental, nonprofit international development organization she has volunteered for since 2017. She also served as the chairperson of the executive council of Women in Management, Business and Public Service (WIMBIZ), a Nigerian non-profit organization where she was part of the establishment in 2001.

Currently, Aishah Ahmad is the Deputy Governor for Financial System Stability at the Central Bank of Nigeria. She is a member of the CBN Governing Board, Monetary Policy Committee, Financial System Stability Committee and the Committee of Governors. She is also Chairperson of the boards of Nigeria Interbank Settlement System (NIBS), the Nigeria Commodity Exchange (NCX) and the Financial Institutions Training Centre (FITC).

Polaris Bank sale
In December 2022, the Peoples Gazette claimed that Mrs. Ahmad helped facilitate the sale of Polaris Bank at a favorable price in order to be considered for the position of Governor of the  Central Bank of Nigeria (CBN). The CBN denied these allegations and asserted that the sale of Polaris Bank was an institutional decision supervised by a committee of senior representatives of Asset Management Corporation of Nigeria (AMCON) and the CBN. The divestment was also coordinated with outside legal and financial advisers and approved by the leadership and boards of Polaris Bank and the purchaser, Strategic Capital Investment Limited. The CBN stated that no other party made a higher purchase offer as alleged by the Peoples Gazette.

Personal life
Aishah Ahmad is married to Abdallah A. Ahmad, a retired Brigadier General in the Nigerian army. The couple have two children.

See also

References

External links
Website of the Central Bank of Nigeria
Images of Aisha Ahmed at Google.com
Full Profile And Biography Of ‘Aishah Ahmad' – The New CBN Deputy Governor

Living people
1976 births
University of Abuja alumni
University of Lagos alumni
Alumni of Cranfield University
Nigerian Muslims
Nigerian accountants
Nigerian women accountants
Nigerian bankers
Nigerian financial analysts
CFA charterholders
Nigerian women in business
People from Niger State
Women in finance
Nigerian investment bankers
People from Bida
Central bankers